Flag of Niš is a rectangular flag and it consist of dark blue background and Coat of Arms of Niš in upper left corner. The flag is made in proportion 1:2, but it's used also in 2:3. The Coat of Arms should take 1/6 of the flag's area. It's used together with a flag of Serbia. It was adopted in 1996. Design of flag was confirmed on 6 June 2002, in article 9 of City of Niš statute.

Other flags

Until 2005 city of Niš consisted of two municipalities, Niš and Niška Banja. Municipality of Niš had its own flag, a rectangular 2:1 flag with blue background, and municipality seal at the centre.

References

Niš